Aasara pension is a pension scheme by the Government of Telangana. It is a welfare scheme of pensions to old people, widows, Goud community, elephantiasis patients, AIDS afflicted people, physically disabled and beedi workers. By March 2018, the number of beneficiaries stood at 42 lakhs.

History
The pension scheme was started on 8 November 2014 by Chief Minister of Telangana, Kalvakuntla Chandrashekhar Rao in Kothur in Mahboobnagar district. The government is spending ₹5,500 crore every year on the scheme.

References

External links
 Official site

Government schemes in Telangana
KCR Government initiatives